A hyperpyramid is a generalisation of the normal pyramid to n dimensions.

In the case of the pyramid one connects all vertices of the base, a polygon in a plane, to a point outside the plane, which is the peak. The pyramid's height is the distance of the peak from the plane. This construction gets generalised to n dimensions. The base becomes a (n − 1)-polytope in a (n − 1)-dimensional hyperplane. A point called apex is located outside the hyperplane and gets connected to all the vertices of the polytope and the distance of the apex from the hyperplane is called height. This construct is called a n-dimensional hyperpyramid.

A normal triangle is a 2-dimensional hyperpyramid, the triangular pyramid is a 3-dimensional hyperpyramid and the pentachoron or tetrahedral pyramid is a 4-dimensional hyperpyramid with a tetrahedron as base.

The n-dimensional volume of a n-dimensional hyperpyramid can be computed as follows:

Here  denotes the n-dimensional volume of the hyperpyramid, A the (n − 1)-dimensional volume of the base and h the height, that is the distance between the apex and the (n − 1)-dimensional hyperplane containing the base A. For n = 2, 3 the formula above yields the standard formulas for the area of a triangle and the volume of a pyramid.

References 
A. M. Mathai: An Introduction to Geometrical Probability. CRC Press, 1999, pp. 41–43
M.G. Kendall: A Course in the Geometry of N Dimensions. Dover Courier, 2004 (reprint), p. 37 

External links 
http://www.mathcurve.com/polyedres/hyperpyramide/hyperpyramide.shtml

Polytopes
Multi-dimensional geometry
Pyramids